George McNally may refer to:

 George Fred McNally (1878–1965), Canadian educator
 George E. McNally (1923–1988), mayor of Mobile, Alabama